This is a list of Rhode Island suffragists, suffrage groups and others associated with the cause of women's suffrage in Rhode Island.

Groups 

 Bristol Equal Suffrage League.
 College Equal Suffrage League, Rhode Island group formed in 1907.
 Congressional Union of Providence, Rhode Island, created in 1916.
 Jamestown Equal Suffrage League.
 Newport County Woman Suffrage League, founded in 1908.
 Providence Woman Suffrage Party.
 Rhode Island Equal Suffrage Association, formed in 1915.
 Rhode Island Women's Suffrage Association, created in 1868.
 Rhode Island Women's Suffrage Party, created in 1913.
 Rhode Island Union of Colored Women's Clubs, created in 1903.
 Woman's Newport League.
 Women's Political Equality League of Providence.

Suffragists 

 Esther H. Abelson (Pawtucket).
 Sara Algeo.
 Agnes Bacon (Providence).
 Mary Rathbone Kelly Ballou (Providence and Portsmouth).
 Alva Belmont (Newport).
 Ellen M. Bolles.
 Margaret M. Campbell.
 Elizabeth Buffum Chace (Providence).
 Elizabeth Kittridge Churchill.
 Paulina Wright Davis (Providence).
 Ardelia C. Dewing.
 Mary H. Dickerson (Newport).
 Sarah E. Doyle.
 Maud Howe Elliot (Newport).
 Jeanette S. French.
 Hannah E. Greene (Providence).
 Annie M. Griffin.
 Frederick A. Hinckley (Providence).
 Bertha Higgins (Providence).
 Julia Ward Howe (Portsmouth).
 Mary E. Jackson (Providence).
 Maria Albertina Kindberg (Providence).
 Maria Ingeborg Kindstedt (Providence).
 Sophia Little.
 Deborah Knox Livingston.
 Clara Brownell May Miller (Newport).
 Martha H. Mowry (Providence).
 Mabel E. Orgelman (Bristol).
 Fanny Purdy Palmer (Providence)
 Annie Peck (Providence).
 Rhoda Anna Fairbanks Peckham.
 Charlotte B. Wilbour.
 Anna Garlin Spencer (Providence).
 Rowena Peck Barnes Tingley.
Camillo von Klenze.
 Frances H. Whipple (Providence).
 Sarah Helen Whitman (Providence).
 Lillie Chace Wyman (Valley Falls).
 Elizabeth Upham Yates.

Politicians supporting women's suffrage 

 Robert Livingston Beeckman.
 Clark Burdick (Newport).
 Edward L. Freeman.
 Joseph H. Gainer (Providence).
 Daniel L. D. Granger (Providence).
 Richard W. Jennings.
 Henry B. Kane (Narragansett).
 Walter R. Stiness.

Suffragists campaigning in Rhode Island 

 Susan B. Anthony.
 Henry B. Blackwell.
 Carrie Chapman Catt.
 Adelaide A. Claifin.
 James Henry Darlington.
 Frederick Douglass.
 Mary F. Eastman.
 William Lloyd Garrison.
 Mary Johnston.
Louise Hall.
 Henry S. Nash.
 Cora Scott Pond.
 Anna Howard Shaw.
 Doris Stevens.
 Lucy Stone.
 Zerelda G. Wallace.

Places 

 Marble House.
 Oak Glen.

Publications 

 The Amendment.
 The Pioneer and Woman's Advocate, founded in 1852.
 The Una, founded in 1853.

Anti-suffragists 
Groups

 Rhode Island Association in Opposition to Woman Suffrage.

Individuals
 Mrs. Edward Johnson.
 Margaret Farnum Lippitt.
 Mary Lippitt Steedman.

See also 

 New England Woman Suffrage Association
 Timeline of women's suffrage in Rhode Island
 Women's suffrage in Rhode Island
 Women's suffrage in the United States

References

Sources 

 
 

Rhode Island suffrage

Rhode Island suffragists
Activists from Rhode Island
History of Rhode Island
Suffragists